John A. "Jack" Quinn (born 1943) is an Irish former Gaelic footballer who played at club level with Kilbride and at inter-county level with the Meath senior football team. He usually lined out as a full-back.

Career

Quinn was a member of the Kilbride club team that earned promotion from junior to senior in the space of five seasons. After winning the respective Meath JFC and Meath IFC titles in 1960 and 1962, he won his first Meath SFC title in 1964. He won a second title in 1967 and then completed a three-in-a-row between 1969 and 1971. Having represented the Meath minor football team, Quinn won an All-Ireland Junior Championship title in 1962 before being picked for the senior team in 1963. He was one of the key figures on the team that won the Leinster Championship that year. Quinn was at full-back for the All-Ireland final defeat by Galway. He was again a member of the team, alongside his brothers Gerry and Martin, when Meath beat Cork in the 1967 All-Ireland final. Quinn won a fourth and final Leinster Championship in 1970 before captaining the team to a defeat by Kerry in the All-Ireland final.

Honours

Kilbride
Meath Senior Football Championship: 1964, 1967, 1969, 1970, 1971
Meath Intermediate Football Championship: 1962
Meath Junior Football Championship: 1960

Meath
All-Ireland Senior Football Championship: 1967
Leinster Senior Football Championship: 1964, 1966, 1967, 1970 (c)
National Football League: 1974–75
All-Ireland Junior Football Championship: 1962
Leinster Junior Football Championship: 1962

References

1943 births
Living people
Gaelic football backs
Kilbride Gaelic footballers
Meath inter-county Gaelic footballers